Shea Properties, a member of the J.F. Shea Co., Inc., family of companies, is a diversified real estate company responsible for the acquisition, design, development, construction and management of business parks, shopping centers, apartment communities and mixed-use environments. The company owns and operates approximately 6,500 apartment units and 5 million square feet of office, industrial and retail space in California, Colorado and Washington.

History
Shea Properties parent company, the J.F. Shea Co, was founded in 1881 in Portland, Oregon by John Francis Shea. The J. F. Shea Company's activities include new-home construction, commercial construction, civil engineering, commercial and multi-family property development and management, construction materials and venture capital. 

The JF Shea Company's projects include the building of the diversion channels for the Hoover Dam, the foundations for the Golden Gate and Oakland Bay bridges, the tunnels for San Francisco's Bay Area Rapid Transit (BART) system and tunnel work for The Metro Crenshaw/LAX Transit Corridor and the Metro Purple Line Extension.

Acquisitions
In 1997, Shea Properties acquired the California-based Mission Viejo Company which included 900 acres of land in Mission Viejo, Aliso Viejo, and Rancho Santa Margarita areas of Orange County and more than 22,000 acres of land in Highlands Ranch, Colorado. 

In 2006, Shea Properties purchased of the Denver Technological Center and Meridian International Business Center. Currently, the company operates in Northern and South Southern California, Colorado and Washington.

J.F. Shea Co., Companies
Trilogy
Shea Mortgage
Shea Homes
Shea Apartment Communities
Venture Capital
J.F. Shea Construction Inc.
Redding
Reed Manufacturing
Blue Star Resort & Golf

References

External links 
 

Real estate companies of the United States
Companies based in Aliso Viejo, California
American companies established in 1881
1881 establishments in Oregon